Thylophorops is an extinct genus of didelphine opossums from the Pliocene of South America. Compared to their close didelphine cousins like the living Philander and Didelphis (and like the still living Lutreolina) opossums, Thylophorops displays specialization towards carnivory, and one species, T. lorenzinii, is the largest known opossum of all time, which could imply a macropredatory role.

Taxonomy 
Thylophorops is rather consistently recovered as a didelphine opossum, most often compared to and usually falling within the Didelphis, Philander and Lutreolina group. Within Thylophorops itself, there are three recognized species:

 Thylophorops chapadmalensis: The type species, known from the Pliocene (Chapadmalalan) Chapadmalal Formation and other (up to Uquian) formations in Argentina. It is known from a variety of skeletal remains, rendering it a fairly common species in the area. It is a large opossum species, comparable to the modern Virginia opossum in size.
 Thylophorops lorenzinii: Currently known only from the holotype MLP 08-III-10-1, a lower jaw and skull fragment, coming from Late Pliocene deposits in Buenos Aires.
 Thylophorops perplana/perplanus: The earliest known species, occurring in Early Pliocene Argentinian deposits.

Biology 
Thylophorops species (as well as several other contemporary opossum genera) show a high degree of speciation towards carnivory compared to most living didelphines. Their premolar and molar teeth were proportionally larger than those of living opossums and their grinding facets imply a more dedicated shearing action; these have been interpreted as "omnivory leading towards carnivory" and as more specialized carnivory in posterior studies.
There is evidence that T. chapadmalensis re-appropriated burrows from other digging mammals, as well as outright consuming them. Thylophorops species as a whole tended to be terrestrial rather than arboreal.

Paleoecology 
Thylophorops lived at a time when South America's older predatory guilds were dismantling. It co-existed with only a few sparassodont and phorusrhacid taxa like Thylacosmilus and Llallawavis, and it, as well as similar opossum species, evolved to fill the ecological blanks. A similar case is observed with the carnivorous armadillo Macroeuphractus, a product of this same era of faunal turn-overs.

As mentioned above, there is evidence of T. chapadmalensis predating on contemporary caviomorphs and appropriating burrows, from them or other mammals such as armadillos.

References 

†Thylophorops
Pliocene mammals of South America
Prehistoric marsupial genera
Chapadmalalan
Huayquerian
Uquian
Neogene Argentina
Fossils of Argentina
Fossil taxa described in 1908
Taxa named by Florentino Ameghino